Aroma is a Moldovan wine producer from Chişinău.

Winery
The Joint Stock Company AROMA, one of the largest wineries in the Republic of Moldova, celebrated in 1998 the first centenary of its history. It is situated in the center of the capital of the Republic, Chişinău. During the years, the winery has been known by different names. The present name appeared in 1983, when the Association of production "AROMA" was created. In January 2000, the winery received the statute of the Joint Stock Company "AROMA".

Reception and distillation of wine materials for divin (cognac), production and bottling of divin and wine are made in the name of the Company.

References

External links
 www.aroma.md - the official site 

Wineries of Moldova